The Decision may refer to:

 The Decision (TV program), TV show that featured basketball player LeBron James' decision to switch teams
 The Decision (play), by the twentieth-century German dramatist Bertolt Brecht
 "The Decision" (Australian Playhouse), an Australian television play
 The Decision (Animorphs), a book in the series
 "The Decision" (song), by English indie rock band Young Knives
 The Decision, song by American comedy rock band Ninja Sex Party from the album NSFW (album)

See also
 Decision (disambiguation)